James Welch may refer to:

 James Welch (VC) (1889–1978), English recipient of the Victoria Cross
 Jim Welch (1938–2017), former American football player
 James Welch (writer) (1940–2003), Native American author and poet
 James T. Welch (born 1975), member of the Massachusetts House of Representatives

See also
James Welsh (disambiguation)